The Yachats River is a short river on the central Oregon coast, about  west-north-west of Eugene.  The name is the native name meaning at the foot of the mountain.

Keller Creek and Stump Creek join after about a mile (1.6 km) of meandering, followed after a half mile (800 m) by Neiglick Creek at river mile 10 (river kilometer 16). The river bed widens significantly and levels out to become very slow moving and turns northward about a half mile, then westward at river mile 8 (river kilometer 13). It meanders westward the rest of the way to the ocean. The sand and stone beach at the river bar is normally very shallow, which allows the tide to change the length of the river as much as a mile.

Named tributaries from source to mouth are Grass Creek, School Fork, then Keller, Stump, and Neiglick creeks followed by the North Fork Yachats River. Below that come Axtell, Helms, Werner, Bend, Clear, Carlson, Dawson, Beamer, South Beamer, Marks, Reedy, and Salmon creeks.

See also 
 List of Oregon rivers

References 

Rivers of Oregon
Rivers of Lane County, Oregon
Rivers of Lincoln County, Oregon
Oregon placenames of Native American origin